Ford Castle is a Grade I listed building situated at a shallow crossing point on the River Till, Ford, Northumberland, England.

The castle dates from about 1278. The owner Sir William Heron was granted a licence to crenellate the castle in 1338.  It was captured by the Scots in 1385 and dismantled by them.  However, by the beginning of the 16th century it had been rebuilt and refortified.  It was taken by James IV of Scotland on the eve of the Battle of Flodden in 1513. The castle passed from the Heron family to the Carr family by marriage in 1549 and again by marriage passed to Sir Francis Blake of Cogges, Oxfordshire in the 1660s.

Blake built a substantial mansion in Tudor style within the castle in 1694. On Blake's death in 1717 the Ford estate passed to the husband of his late daughter Mary and then in 1723 to her son Francis Blake Delaval (1692–1752). In 1761 John Delaval, 1st Baron Delaval (1728–1808) rebuilt the Hall with the assistance of architect George Raffield in a Gothic style.

On his death, the property passed to his granddaughter Susannah who had married the Marquess of Waterford. In 1862 Louisa, Dowager Marchioness of Waterford (d 1891), widow of the 3rd Marquess, restored and substantially remodelled the Hall.

The castle was acquired in 1907 by the coal-mining magnate James Joicey, 1st Baron Joicey, and it stayed with his family, in 1956 it was leased to Northumberland County Council as a Young Persons' Residential Centre. 

In 2022, Ford Castle was acquired by PGL who now operate the site as an outdoor activity centre offering residential trips for schools, groups and young people.

References

Ford Castle 1
  Images and History of Ford Castle
Fry, Plantagenet Somerset, The David & Charles Book of Castles, David & Charles, 1980. 
PGL Ford Castle 

Castles in Northumberland
Grade I listed buildings in Northumberland
Grade I listed castles
1278 establishments in England
Castle